NGC 6786 is an interacting spiral galaxy 350 million light years from the Earth, in the constellation of Draco.  NGC 6786 is currently interacting with LEDA 62867, and, being the larger galaxy, it is likely that NGC 6786 will absorb LEDA 62867 in the future. Both galaxies appear to be undergoing a starburst, a phenomenon commonly seen among interacting and merging galaxies.

One supernova has been observed in NGC 6786:  SN 2004ed (Type IIn, mag. 17).

See also
Interacting galaxies

References

External links
 

Draco (constellation)
Barred spiral galaxies
Interacting galaxies
Luminous infrared galaxies
6786
11414